The Potez XI was the first fighter aircraft designed by the French company Potez. Designed in 1922, the only aircraft first flew on December 11 of that year, after which further development work stopped. It was built to meet CAP (chasse armée protection) 2 requirements created in 1919 by the new director of Aeronautics, General Duval. It was to perform bomber, intercept and tactical reconnaissance for the military, as well as escort fighters. The aircraft was to be powered by a turbo-supercharged engine.

Specifications

References

R11
1920s French fighter aircraft
Aircraft first flown in 1922